Needham Market Ward is a local government ward in Mid-Suffolk, Suffolk, England has elected two councillors. The next election is scheduled for May 2023.

Councillors

2011 Results

2015 Results
The turnout of the election was 66.26%.

2019 Results
The turnout of the election was 28.19%.

See also
Mid Suffolk local elections

References

External links
Mid Suffolk Council

Wards of Mid Suffolk District
Needham Market